Events from the year 1793 in Canada.

Incumbents
Monarch: George III

Federal government
Parliament of Lower Canada — 1st
Parliament of Upper Canada — 1st

Governors
Governor of the Canadas: Guy Carleton, 1st Baron Dorchester
Governor of New Brunswick: Thomas Carleton
Governor of Nova Scotia: John Wentworth
Commodore-Governor of Newfoundland: John Elliot
Governor of St. John's Island: Edmund Fanning
Governor of Upper Canada: John Graves Simcoe

Events
 Alexander Mackenzie reaches Pacific Ocean at Bella Coola. 
 David Thompson surveys Muskrat Country west of Hudson Bay.
 HBC Brandon House established on the Assiniboine River, outpost for trade south and southwest to Missouri and Yellowstone.
 Mackenzie reaches the Pacific at Dean Channel.
 May 9 First Parliament, of Lower Canada prorogued.
 July 9 Act Against Slavery passed into law, making Upper Canada the first British territory to bring in legislation against slavery, although it does not abolish slavery entirely.
 Merchant vessels first navigate Lake Ontario.

Births
 March 24 : François-Xavier Paré, politician.

Deaths
 March 30 : François-Marie Picoté de Belestre, colonial soldier.

 
Canada
93